Guitars of Love is a 1954 West German musical film directed by Werner Jacobs and starring Vico Torriani, Elma Karlowa and Harald Juhnke.

It was shot at the Bavaria Studios in Munich. The film's sets were designed by the art director Hans Berthel. It was shot using Eastmancolor.

Main cast
 Vico Torriani as Roberto Trenti
Elma Karlowa as Ilona
Harald Juhnke as Walter
Topsy Küppers as Gisa
Gerd Vespermann as Tom
Ralph Lothar as Fred Jaques
Annunzio Mantovani as Enrico Mantovani
 Hermann Pfeiffer as Bernardo

References

Bibliography
 Colin MacKenzie. Mantovani: A Lifetime in Music. Melrose Press, 2005.

External links

1954 films
1954 musical films
West German films
German musical films
1950s German-language films
Films directed by Werner Jacobs
Films set in Italy
Films about singers
Films shot at Bavaria Studios
1950s German films